The Early Writings of Bronislaw Malinowski is a 1962 anthropological book collecting some early short works of Polish scholar Bronisław Malinowski, published posthumously.

References 

1993 non-fiction books
Books by Bronisław Malinowski
Anthropology books